Hoyt Sherman Place, the home of Hoyt Sherman, was built in 1877 and is located in Des Moines, Iowa.

History
In 1850, Hoyt purchased five acres of land in Des Moines for $105. In 1877, Hoyt Sherman Place, the family home, was completed with the help of William Foster (Iowa architect). Almost immediately, it is noted in writings to be, "a society showplace of the grandest scale." Among its distinguished guests in history are General Sherman, General Ulysses S. Grant, General Philip Sheridan, and Major William McKinley.

In 1893, Hoyt Sherman rented his home out to The Sisters of Mercy from Davenport, Iowa. Within the walls of the home, the Sisters created the first Mercy Hospital. It held 52 beds and operated for nearly two years.

Sherman and his wife, Sara, raised five children, Frank, Addie, Charles, Arthur, and Helen, in the home. Major Hoyt Sherman died in January 1904.   

In 1995, the Hoyt Sherman Place Foundation was founded by the Des Moines Women's Club.  Ownership of the house and all art and artifacts contained in it were given to the Foundation by the Des Moines Women's Club.  The club also provided an endowment, which was increased by the sale of the painting To the Memory of Cole by Frederic Edwin Church. In 2017 the Hoyt Sherman Place Foundation completed restoration of all major paintings in the collection.

The house was added to the National Register of Historic Places in 1977.  In 2015 Hoyt Sherman Place was inducted into The Iowa Rock 'n' Roll Hall of Fame.  The Des Moines Sherman Hill neighborhood takes its name from Hoyt Sherman Place.

Art Gallery 
In 1885 the Des Moines Women’s Club decided that creating an art collection in the city of Des Moines was a top priority. The first piece they purchased was a bronze statue of Joan of Arc at the Chicago World's Fair, World's Columbian Exposition in 1893. This piece is still on display at Hoyt Sherman Place.  The collection continued to grow with purchases from the Women's Club as well as a large donation of art and artifacts from Major S.H.M. Byers, author of The Song of Iowa and Sherman's March to the Sea  and his wife, Margaret, in 1912 as well as other generous donors from the Des Moines area. The majority of these works are still on display in the Hoyt Sherman Place Gallery. Some of the paintings are attributed to well-known artists such as Otto van Veen, Robert Reid (American Painter), Edwin Lord Weeks and Andrea del Verrocchio.

Theater 
The original theater was built in 1923. In 2004 a major theater restoration project took place. The historic theater has seating available for 1,252 guests. Some of the major acts that have performed at the Hoyt Sherman Place Theater include: Dwight Yoakam, Dave Chappelle, Martina McBride and David Sedaris.

Renovation and Addition 
The full restoration of the upper level of the mansion was completed in 2021. The COVID-19 shutdown allowed for the time needed to restore the second floor to the original floorplan including Hoyt and Sara Sherman's bedroom as well as their daughter, Helen Sherman's bedroom. Their daughter, Helen Sherman Griffith was born and raised in the Sherman home and as an adult became a well known author of children's books.

The rooms have been restored top to bottom including period-appropriate lighting fixtures, paint, flooring and décor.

The Center for Artists and Education was completed in 2020. It includes classroom and rehearsal spaces as well as modern dressing rooms, loading dock, administrative offices and additional event spaces.

Des Moines Women's Club 
In 1907 Hoyt Sherman Place became the clubhouse of the Des Moines Women’s Club .  The Club added an art gallery, the first public art museum in the city. In 1923, a 1400-seat auditorium was completed for Club programs.  In 1995 the Hoyt Sherman Place Foundation was created to provide long-term care and protection of the home and collection as well as run the day-to-day operations. The Women's Club continues to meet at the historic home and contribute to its ongoing success.

References

External links
  – Official website
 www.desmoineswomensclub.com – Des Moines Women's Club
 Iowa Rock and Roll Hall of Fame

Houses on the National Register of Historic Places in Iowa
Houses completed in 1877
Houses in Des Moines, Iowa
Tourist attractions in Des Moines, Iowa
Theatres in Iowa
Music venues in Iowa
National Register of Historic Places in Des Moines, Iowa
Individually listed contributing properties to historic districts on the National Register in Iowa
1877 establishments in Iowa